Ahmad Mansour Al-Ahmad Al-Sabah (born 1969) was a Kuwaiti politician. He served as Deputy Prime Minister and Minister of Defence from 2019 to 2020.

Biography 

 He holds a BA in Supportive Media (Political Science) from the University of Kansas.
 Diploma in Military Sciences from Ali Al-Sabah Military College.
 Intelligence and Security Officer.
 Assistant tank company commander.
 Captain in the Directorate of Military Affairs in the Office of the Minister of Defense (1991-2002).
 Director of the Department of Public Affairs in the Office of the Minister of Defense.
 Director of Contracts and External Procurement Department.
 Assistant Undersecretary for External Equipment.
 Assistant Undersecretary for Administrative Affairs.
 Vice Chairman of the Board of Directors of the National Offset Company, representing the Kuwaiti Ministry of Defense.
 Head of the Medical Services Authority.
 Chairman of the Direct Offset Committee (2003-2013).
 Member of the Board of Directors of the Public Authority for Youth and Sports since 2006.
 Chairman of the Board of Directors, Director General of the Public Authority for Youth and Sports (2014).
 He completed many advanced military courses in Kuwait, the UAE and America.
 Member of the Standing Committee for the Celebration of National Holidays.
 In October 2017, he was appointed Undersecretary of the Ministry of Defense.
 On December 17, 2019, the late Emir Sheikh Sabah Al-Ahmad Al-Jaber Al-Sabah issued a decree to form the government, where he was appointed as Deputy Prime Minister and Minister of Defense and continued in the position until December 14, 2020.
 On December 28, 2021, Sheikh Mishal Al-Ahmad Al-Jaber Al-Sabah, Crown Prince of the State of Kuwait, issued a decree to form the government, where he was appointed as Deputy Prime Minister and Minister of Interior, and continued in the position until February 17, 2022, when he submitted his resignation from the position.

Family Life 
Sheikh Ahmed Mansour Al-Sabah is married and has two children:

 Sheikh Mansour Ahmed Al-Mansour Al-Sabah
 Sheikh Abdul Rahman Ahmad Al-Mansour Al-Sabah

References

See also
Cabinet of Kuwait

1969 births
Living people
University of Kansas alumni
Government ministers of Kuwait
Defence ministers of Kuwait
House of Al-Sabah